Georg Nowka (born 7 November 1910, date of death unknown) was a German sailor. He competed for Germany at the 1952 Summer Olympics and won a bronze medal in the Dragon Class with Theodor Thomsen and Erich Natusch. He also competed for the United Team of Germany at the 1956 Summer Olympics.

References
 

1910 births
Year of death missing
German male sailors (sport)
Olympic sailors of Germany
Olympic bronze medalists for Germany
Olympic medalists in sailing
Medalists at the 1952 Summer Olympics
Sailors at the 1952 Summer Olympics – Dragon
Olympic sailors of the United Team of Germany
Sailors at the 1956 Summer Olympics – Dragon